Frank Edwin Wood (February 26, 1891 – January 1, 1972), incorrectly identified as Frank E. Worth in current media guides, was an American football coach and mathematics professor.

Education
Wood received a B.A. from Baker University in Baldwin City, Kansas in 1912, an AM degree from the University of Kansas in 1914, and a Ph.D. from the University of Chicago in 1920.

Coaching career
He served as the head football coach at the University of New Mexico in 1917, accepting duties on short notice while regular coach Ralph Hutchinson was called into military service during World War I.

Academic career
Wood served as a faculty member at a number of institutions, including Northwestern University, Princeton University, the University of Oregon, as well as the University of New Mexico.

References

1891 births
1972 deaths
New Mexico Lobos football coaches
Northwestern University faculty
University of Chicago alumni
University of Kansas alumni
University of New Mexico faculty
University of Oregon faculty
Baker University alumni
People from Wamego, Kansas